Bankard-Gunther Mansion is a historic home located at Baltimore, Maryland, United States. It is a three-story, three bay wide, nine bay deep, flat roofed brick building built in 1866.  It is a richly embellished Italianate style building built originally for Jacob J. Bankard, one of many enterprising and prominent butchers who flocked to "Butcher’s Hill", and later George Gunther, who established the Gunther Brewing Company in Baltimore. In 1919 the building became an important Baltimore charitable center to be used by the Hebrew Home for Incurables and the Emmanuel Center to provide humanitarian service to the community.

Bankard-Gunther Mansion was listed on the National Register of Historic Places in 1980.

References

External links
, including photo from 2004, at Maryland Historical Trust

Butchers Hill, Baltimore
Houses on the National Register of Historic Places in Baltimore
Houses in Baltimore
Houses completed in 1866
Italianate architecture in Maryland
1866 establishments in Maryland